The 2015 Rother District Council election took place on 7 May 2015 to elect members of Rother District Council in East Sussex, England. The whole council was up for election and the Conservative Party stayed in overall control of the council.

Background
At the last election in 2011 the Conservatives remained in control of the council with 27 councillors, while the Liberal Democrats took 5 seats, independents 4 seats and the Labour Party won 2 seats. By the time of the 2015 election three of the Conservative councillors for Bexhill had resigned from the Conservatives to sit as independents. Deirdre Williams and Paul Lendon left the party in July 2012 and then in May 2014 Joanne Gadd also became an independent councillor.

Election result
The Conservatives increased their majority on the council after winning 31 seats, up from 24 before the election. This came at the expense of the independents who were reduced in number from seven to four. The Liberal Democrats also dropped three seats to have two councillors, with the group leader Kevin Dixon defeated by 65 votes in Battle. The Labour group leader Sam Souster was also defeated in Rye, leaving the party with only one councillor.

Ward results

By-elections between 2015 and 2019

Battle Town by-election
A by-election was held in Battle Town on 16 July 2015 after the resignation of Conservative councillor Martin Noakes due to ill health. The seat was gained for the Liberal Democrats by Kevin Dixon with a 409-vote majority over Conservative Hazel Sharman.

Collington by-election
A by-election was held in Collington on 27 October 2016 after the resignation of independent councillor Tony Mansi for health reasons. The seat was won by independent candidate Deirdre Earl-Williams.

Darwell by-election
A by-election was held in Darwell on 27 October 2016 after the resignation of Conservative councillor Emily Rowlinson. The seat was won by Conservative candidate John Barnes.

St Marks by-election
A by-election was held in St Marks on 10 January 2019 after the death of independent councillor Stuart Earl. The seat was won by independent candidate Kathy Harmer.

References

2015
2015 English local elections
May 2015 events in the United Kingdom
2010s in East Sussex